Mayangukiral Oru Maadhu is a 1975 Indian Tamil-language film directed by S. P. Muthuraman and produced by S. Baskar. The film stars R. Muthuraman, Sujatha, Thengai Srinivasan, Fatafat Jayalaxmi, and Vijayakumar. It revolves around a married woman who must try to keep a one-night stand that she had in college a secret from her husband, and thwart a persistent blackmailer intent on collecting money from her to keep quiet about it.

Mayangukiral Oru Maadhu was released on 30 May 1975. The film was remade in Kannada as Baalu Jenu (1976), in Telugu as Yavvanam Katesindi (1976), and in Hindi as Bezubaan (1982).

Plot 

Kalpana, a college girl, has a one-night stand with Balu and becomes pregnant, but is saved by her hostel roommate Revathi and a lady doctor. She later marries Kumar, the doctor's brother. Kalpana later discovers that Vasan, a photographer, is aware of her one-night stand with Balu, and strives to keep this a secret from Kumar, even as Vasan begins blackmailing her for money to keep quiet about it.

Cast 
R. Muthuraman as Kumar
Sujatha as Kalpana
Thengai Srinivasan as Vasan
Vijayakumar as Balu
Fatafat Jayalaxmi as Revathi

Themes 
C. R. W. David, in the book Cinema as Medium of Communication in Tamil Nadu, compared Mayangukiral Oru Maadhu to Avalum Penn Thaane (1974) because in both films, the lead female has "fallen" in her past.

Soundtrack 
The music was composed by Vijaya Bhaskar. The song "Samsaram Enbathu Veenai" reflects the expectations of a husband about his wife, with the lyrics "Samsaram enbathu veenai, santhosam enbathu ragam, salanangal athil illai" (wife is a veena, happiness is the raga, there are no discordant notes in it).

Release and reception 
Mayangukiral Oru Maadhu was released on 30 May 1975. Kanthan of Kalki said Babu's cinematography uplifted the film while appreciating Muthuraman's direction and called Sujatha's performance as lifeline of the film.

References

External links 
 

1970s Tamil-language films
1975 films
Films directed by S. P. Muthuraman
Films scored by Vijaya Bhaskar
Tamil films remade in other languages